Bee is a given name and a nickname, usually of Beatrice of:

 Bee Ho Gray (1885–1951), performer in Wild West shows, vaudeville, circus, silent films and radio
 Bee Nguyen (born 1981), member of the Georgia House of Representatives
 Beatrice Bee Palmer (1894–1967), American singer and dancer
 Bee Vang (born 1991), actor
 Beatrice Bee Wilson (born 1974), British food writer and historian

See also
Bee (surname)

Hypocorisms